This is the discography of British industrial/post-punk band Cabaret Voltaire.

Albums

Studio albums

Live albums

Remix albums

Soundtrack albums

Compilation albums

Box sets

Video albums

EPs

Singles

Selected compilation appearances 

 A Factory Sample (1978) – "Baader Meinhof" and "Sex in Secret"
 C81 (1981) – "Raising the Count"
 A Diamond Hidden in the Mouth of a Corpse (1985) – "Dead Man's Shoes"
 Salvation! Original soundtrack (1987) – "Twanky Party" and "Jesus Saves"
 Wasted: The Best of Volume, Part I (1995) – "Low Cool" (remix)
 Some Bizzare Artists: Redefining the Prologue (2006) – "Crackdown"

References

Discographies of British artists
Rock music group discographies